Michael Dewar may refer to:

 Michael J. S. Dewar (1918–1997), theoretical chemist
 Michael Dewar (rugby union) (born 1997), Scottish rugby union player